The following is a list of squads for each nation competing in football at the 1935 Central American and Caribbean Games in San Salvador.

Costa Rica
Head coach:    Ricardo Saprissa

Cuba
Head coach:  Károly Katzer

El Salvador
Head coach:  Pablo Ferre Elías

Guatemala
Head coach:  Jimmy Elliott

Honduras
Head coach:  Jacobo de Fuenquinos

Mexico
Head coach:  Alfred C. Crowle

References

External links
 

1935 Central American and Caribbean Games
1935
1935